Rex De Garis (29 December 1896 – 14 June 1967) was an Australian rules footballer who played with St Kilda in the Victorian Football League (VFL).

De Garis was appointed as playing coach of the Corowa Football Club who played in the Ovens and Murray Football League in 1924.

De Garis was playing coach of Nhill Football Club in 1926.

De Garis was playing coach of Rochester Football Club in 1927.

De Garis was playing coach of Sorrento Football Club in 1931.

Notes

External links 

"The Weekly Times", Rival captains in Albury match, April 5, 2020

1896 births
1967 deaths
Australian rules footballers from Victoria (Australia)
St Kilda Football Club players
Prahran Football Club players